Diplochlamys may refer to:
 a synonym for the plant genus Mallotus
 Diplochlamys (protist), an ameboid protist genus in the family Microcoryciidae in the order Arcellinida